CSA Air is a cargo airline based in Kingsford, Michigan, United States. It operates express cargo services in Michigan, Wisconsin, Indiana and South Dakota, operating 34 flights a day. Its main base is Ford Airport in Iron Mountain, Michigan and its air traffic control call sign Iron Air is derived from that city. It exclusively serves as an affiliate of FedEx Feeder, a regional service that operates as a subsidiary of FedEx Express.

History 
The airline was established in 1998 and is wholly owned by Air T.

Fleet 
The CSA Air fleet consists of 25 Cessna 208 Caravans.

Operations

In the United States, FedEx Express operates FedEx Feeder on a dry lease program where the contractor will lease the aircraft from the FedEx fleet and provide a crew to operate the aircraft solely for FedEx. All of the feeder aircraft operated in the United States are owned by FedEx and because of this all of the aircraft are in the FedEx Feeder livery. Just like regional airlines, the contractor will operate the aircraft with their own flight number and call sign.

References

Cargo airlines of the United States
Airlines established in 1998
Airlines based in Michigan
1998 establishments in Michigan